Anthony Harrison (born September 26, 1965, in Toccoa, Georgia) is a former player in the NFL. He played for the Green Bay Packers. He played for the Georgia Tech Yellow Jackets in college.

1965 births
Living people
People from Toccoa, Georgia
American football safeties
Georgia Tech Yellow Jackets football players
Green Bay Packers players
Players of American football from Georgia (U.S. state)